Barachois is a coastal lagoon separated from the ocean by a sand bar.

Barachois may also refer to:
 Barachois, Newfoundland and Labrador, a hamlet on the Labrador coast of Canada
 Barachois, a community in Percé, Quebec, Canada
 Barachois station in Barachois
 The Barachois, a lake of Cape Breton Regional Municipality, Nova Scotia, Canada. 
 Barachois (band), an Acadian folk band of Canada

See also 
 Barachois Brook, Newfoundland and Labrador, a town on Newfoundland, Canada
 Barachois Harbour, a community in Nova Scotia, Canada
 Barachois Pond Provincial Park, along the west coast of Newfoundland and Labrador, Canada
 Grand Barachois, a lake on the Saint Pierre and Miquelon territory of France off the coast of Newfoundland
 Grand-Barachois, New Brunswick, a Canadian Rural Service District since amalgamated into Beaubassin Est